is a retired Japanese professional shogi player who achieved the rank of 5-dan.

Early life
Yūki Fujikura was born on October 23, 1979, in Shinjuku, Tokyo. He was accepted into the Japan Shogi Association's apprentice school at the rank of 6-kyū as a student of shogi professional  in 1992, was promoted to 1-dan in 1998, and finally obtained full professional status and corresponding rank of 4-dan in October 2002 after winning the 31st 3-dan League (April 2002October 2002) with a record of 13 wins and 5 losses.

Shogi professional
Fujikura retired from professional shogi on May 19, 2022. He finished his career with a record of 168 wins and 236 losses.

Promotion history
The promotion history for Fujikura is as follows:
1992: 6-kyū
1998: 1-dan
2002, October 1: 4-dan
2012, April 22: 5-dan
2022, May 19: Retired

References

External links
 ShogiHub: Professional Player Info · Fujikura, Yuki
 blog: 志木こども教室ブログ

1979 births
Japanese shogi players
Living people
Professional shogi players
Professional shogi players from Tokyo
Retired professional shogi players
People from Shinjuku